The 2015–16 season was Edinburgh Rugby's fifteenth season competing in the Pro12.

Team

Coaches
Alan Solomons signed a contract extension to stay on as head coach for another year. He'll again be assisted by Stevie Scott.

Joining the coaching team former Scotland stand-off Duncan Hodge who joined  from the Scotland national team. Also joining in the summer was former All Black, Australia and Crusaders strength and conditioning coach Ash Jones. He also worked with the Scotland national squad in preparation for Rugby World Cup 2015. Englishman Peter Wilkins joined as defence coach from Queensland Reds.

Coaches
 Alan Solomons  (Head coach)
 Stevie Scott  (Forwards coach)
 Duncan Hodge (Backs coach)
 Ash Jones (Head of S&C)
 Peter Wilkins (Defence coach)

Other coaches
 Marc Keys (Assistant S&C Coach)
 Ben Atiga (Player and Skills Coach)
 Murray Fleming (Lead performance analyst)
 Paul Larter (Performance analyst)

Squad

Transfers

Personnel In
  Magnus Bradbury from Scottish Rugby Academy
  William Helu from  Wasps
   Nasi Manu from Highlanders/Canterbury
  Rory Sutherland from Scottish Rugby Academy
  Nathan Fowles from Sale Sharks
  Michael Allen from Ulster Rugby
  Blair Kinghorn
  Duncan Hodge from  Scottish national team
  Murdo McAndrew 4 month trial 
  Otulea Katoa from Southland Rugby
  John Hardie from Southland Rugby and Highlanders
  Jason Tovey from Newport Gwent Dragons(loan)

Players Out
 Tom Heathcote to  Worcester Warriors
 Grayson Hart to  Glasgow Warriors
 Ollie Atkins to  Exeter Chiefs
 Tim Visser to  Harlequins
 Carl Bezuidenhout Retired
 Jamie Farndale to Scotland 7s
 Hugh Blake to Glasgow Warriors
 Joaquín Domínguez to US Cognac
 Tomás Leonardi to Toulouse
 James Hilterbrand to Manly
 David Denton to Bath Rugby
 Greig Tonks to London Irish

Competitions

Pre season

Match 1

Match 2

Player statistics
During the 2015–16 season, Edinburgh have used forty different players in competitive games. The table below shows the number of appearances and points scored by each player.

Pro12

League table

Results

Round 1

Round 2

Round 3

Round 4

Round 5

Round 6

Round 7

Round 8

Round 9

Round 10  (1872 Cup - 23-11 agg.)

Round 11  (1872 Cup - 34-25 agg.)

Round 12

Round 13

Round 14

Round 15

Round 16

Round 17

Round 18

Round 19

European Rugby Challenge Cup

Table

Results

Round 1

Round 2

Round 3

Round 4

Round 5

Round 6

References

2015-16
2015–16 in Scottish rugby union
2015–16 Pro12 by team
2015–16 European Rugby Champions Cup by team